The dark sleeper, Odontobutis obscura, is a species of freshwater sleeper native to China, Japan, and Korea. It is a commercially important species. This species is also variously called Toadonn, Toadfish, and Toadle.

Diet
The Dark sleeper diet mainly consists of zoobenthos: chironomids, small aquatic bugs and larvae, which are all found in the benthic zone of the water column.

References

Odontobutis
Fish of Japan
Freshwater fish of China
Fish of Korea
Fish of East Asia
Freshwater fish of Asia
Fish described in 1845